Louis of Valois may refer to:

Louis XI, king of France
Louis XII, king of France
 (1318–1328)
Louis I, Duke of Orléans (1372–1407)
Louis, Duke of Guyenne (1397–1415)
Louis I of Anjou (1339–1384)
Louis II of Anjou, king of Naples
Louis III of Anjou, king of Naples
Louis II d'Orléans, Duke of Longueville (1510–1537)
Louis of Valois (1549–1550), prince

See also
House of Valois